Liptena nigromarginata is a butterfly in the family Lycaenidae. It is found in north-western Tanzania, Uganda, the Democratic Republic of the Congo (Sankuru) and the Republic of the Congo. The habitat consists of forests.

References

Butterflies described in 1961
Liptena